Italy competed at the 2002 Winter Paralympics in Salt Lake City, United States. 14 competitors from Italy won 9 medals including 3 gold, 3 silver and 3 bronze and finished 11th in the medal table.

See also 
 Italy at the Paralympics
 Italy at the 2002 Winter Olympics

References 

2002
2002 in Italian sport
Nations at the 2002 Winter Paralympics